Herbert Eugene Merwin (20 February 20 1878, Newton, Kansas – 29 January 1963, Washington, D.C.) was an American mineralogist and petrologist.

Merwin grew up in Hensonville, New York after moving there with his family when he was two years old. After graduating from high school, he taught for several years in New York State public high schools and at the Normal School in Oneonta. He then studied at Harvard University, where he received his bachelor's degree in 1907 and his Ph.D. in 1911. He became in 1909 a staff member of the Geophysical Laboratory of the Carnegie Institution in Washington, D.C. and was employed there until his retirement in 1945. After retirement he continued there as a research associate until 1959.

He was considered a leading authority on crystal optics.

He was president in 1931 of the Mineralogical Society of America, whose Roebling Medal he received in 1949. The mineral merwinite is named in his honor.

Selected publications
  Some late Wisconsin and post-Wisconsin shore-lines of northwestern Vermont , Cambridge, Massachusetts: Printed for the Museum, 1908
 Mineralogical and petrographical researches, with special reference to the stability ranges of the alkaline feldspars, Ph. D. Harvard University 1911
 with George Atwater Rankin: 
 with G. A. Rankin: 
 with Eugen Posnjak: 
 with John Bright Ferguson: 
 with E. Posnjak: 
 with Howard Shreve Roberts: 
 with Robert Hamilton Lombard:

References

External links
 
 

American mineralogists
Petrologists
Harvard University alumni
1878 births
1963 deaths